João Marquilhas (born 24 July 1959) is a Portuguese fencer. He competed in the individual sabre event at the 1984 Summer Olympics.

References

External links
 

1959 births
Living people
Portuguese male sabre fencers
Olympic fencers of Portugal
Fencers at the 1984 Summer Olympics